Mauro Boerchio (born 16 August 1989) is an Italian professional footballer who plays as a goalkeeper.

Career

Vanuatu

Agreeing to an offer from Vanuatuan giants Amicale in February 2015 and making his debut in the 2015 Port Vila Shield, Boerchio helped them do well in the domestic cup and Premier League, mixing with Vanuatuans as well as fellow Italians, Argentineans, Serbians, South Americans, two New Zealanders, a Scotsman, and a couple Swiss throughout his stay there. During his first season with Amicable, the Broni native won the league with the team, participating in the OFC Champions League also.

Temporarily relocated to Australia following Cyclone Pam, which hit Vanuatu in 2015.

Malta

Accepting a contract with Gzira United of the Maltese Premier League in November 2016, Boerchio was released early by the club after failing to impress the coach.

Mongolia

Alongside Federico Zini, Boerchio sealed a move to Ulaanbaatar City of the Mongolian Premier League in 2017. There, he was lionized by the media and featured in various commercials.

Maldives

Took up a contract with Maziya S&RC of the Maldivian Dhivehi Premier League for the 2018 season.

India

On 18 August 2018, I-League club NEROCA FC announced the signing of Boerchio, who rejoined his former Ulaanbaatar City coach, Manuel Retamero Fraile.

On 14 February 2019, Boerchio was loaned out to Chennai City as a replacement for the injured Nauzet Santana.

Honours

Club
Chennai City FC
I-League: 2018–19

References

External links 
 Italian Wikipedia Page
 at Footdalldatabase.eu
 

1989 births
Living people
Expatriate footballers in the Maldives
Association football goalkeepers
Italian expatriate footballers
People from Broni
Expatriate footballers in Malta
Expatriate footballers in Mongolia
Savona F.B.C. players
S.S.C. Bari players
Expatriate footballers in Vanuatu
New Radiant S.C. players
Italian footballers
Italian expatriate sportspeople in Malta
Gżira United F.C. players
Amicale F.C. players
A.C. Renate players
Calcio Lecco 1912 players
Footballers from Lombardy
Sportspeople from the Province of Pavia